Parevander is a genus of beetles in the family Cerambycidae, containing the following species:

 Parevander hovorei Giesbert in Giesbert and Penrose, 1984
 Parevander nietii (Guérin-Méneville, 1844)
 Parevander nobilis (Bates, 1872)
 Parevander unicolor (Bates, 1880)
 Parevander xanthomelas (Guérin-Méneville, 1844)

References

Trachyderini
Taxa named by Per Olof Christopher Aurivillius
Cerambycidae genera